Sergio “Pato” Miguez is a retired Argentine association football defender who spent one season in Major League Soccer.

In 1986, Miguez began his professional career with Club Atlético River Plate.  Over the years, he played for eight teams in Argentina before ending his career with the Columbus Crew during the 1997 Major League Soccer season.

External links
 

Living people
1967 births
Argentine footballers
Argentine expatriate footballers
Club Atlético Platense footballers
Columbus Crew players
Instituto footballers
Major League Soccer players
Racing Club de Avellaneda footballers
Club Atlético River Plate footballers
San Martín de Tucumán footballers
Textil Mandiyú footballers
Association football defenders
People from San Isidro, Buenos Aires
Sportspeople from Buenos Aires Province